Yellow Moon may refer to:

 Yellow Moon (Neville Brothers album), 1989, or the title song
 Yellow Moon (Don Williams album), 1983, or the title song
 Yellow Moon (EP), a 2006 EP by Akeboshi, or the title song
 "Yellow Moon", a 1961 song by The Viscaynes

See also
 The Yellow Moon Band, an English band